Dahlgren Chapel of the Sacred Heart, often shortened to Dahlgren Chapel, is a Roman Catholic chapel located in Dahlgren Quadrangle on the main campus of Georgetown University in Washington, D.C. The chapel was built in 1893, and is located in the historic center of the campus. 

The chapel falls within the territorial jurisdiction of the Archdiocese of Washington and is administered by Jesuits. It is a part of the Parish of the Holy Trinity.

Located in the Georgetown neighborhood, the chapel is a contributing property of the Georgetown Historic District and is listed on the District of Columbia Inventory of Historic Sites.

History

Construction

Construction of the red, brick, Dahlgren Chapel began in 1892. It became the first building on Georgetown's campus to be funded entirely by external philanthropy, as well as the first to be named after a non-Jesuit. Elizabeth Wharton Drexel, spouse of Georgetown undergraduate, graduate, and law school alumnus John Vinton Dahlgren (whose father was Rear Admiral John Dahlgren), donated $10,000 for its construction as a memorial to their first son, Joseph Drexel Dahlgren, who died at the age of one year in 1891. Elizabeth "Bessie" Drexel took a personal interest in overseeing the fabrication of the stained glass windows, which were designed by Franz Mayer of Munich. The windows depict sixteen unique scenes of Jesus, the Virgin Mary, and several saints including Joan of Arc and Ignatius of Loyola. At the laying of the cornerstone, an address was given by Cardinal James Gibbons.

Construction of the roughly neo-Gothic building was completed in 1893 and dedication to the Sacred Heart of Jesus occurred that same year. At the time of its completion, Dahlgren Chapel was positioned in the geographic center of campus, behind Healy Hall and adjacent to Old North, the oldest standing building on campus. Today, it resides in the historic and administrative center of campus and, along with its surrounding buildings, encloses Dahlgren Quadrangle. Prior to the opening of the new house of worship, students utilized a chapel on the second floor of Isaac Hawkins Hall (known at the time as Mulledy Hall).

Beneath the altar of the chapel is the Dahlgren family crypt, where Elizabeth and John Dahlgren are buried, along with their son, Joseph. The church bell atop the chapel was the bell of the Calvert mission in the Maryland colony.

Historic cross
After years of disregard, a large iron cross was rediscovered in the basement of Healy Hall in 1989. The 2 ft by 4 ft cross, weighing 24 pounds, is horizontally inscribed with "ad perpetuam rei memoriam," which translates from Latin as "may this be eternally remembered," and vertically inscribed with "This cross is said to have been brought by the first settlers from England to St. Mary's." It is believed to have been carried by ship from England to St. Clement's Island and St. Mary's City of the Maryland Colony by the Jesuits, thereby making it present at the first Roman Catholic Mass said in English-speaking North America. The cross is today housed in Dahlgren Chapel. The same cross was used in a Mass celebrated by Pope Francis at the Basilica of the National Shrine on September 23, 2015, when he visited Washington, D.C., his first Mass in the United States as Pope. 

The cross was used in an exhibition of the Smithsonian Institution at the National Museum of American History for one year in 2017.

Though weddings in the chapel were suspended by the archdiocese in the 1990s, the chapel is now a popular venue for weddings of Georgetown alumni.

21st century
In 2011, Georgetown undertook an $8 million renovation of the chapel, the fourth in its history. Major structural renovations and interior refurbishments were made, including a reinforcement of the foundation, and the stained glass windows were removed, re-leaded, and re-installed. A new pipe organ was installed during the renovation. The building had previously been renovated in 1976 and 1990. Following its most recent renovation, the chapel can seat 275 people.

In 2013, the chapel was the subject of vandalism, which involved damage to furniture and a processional cross. An investigation indicated that the damage was not motivated by religious desecration.

In popular culture
The exterior of Dahlgren Chapel is featured in the 1973 film The Exorcist. In the movie, the chapel is the residence of Damien Karras, a Catholic priest and psychiatrist in residence. The chapel is desecrated early in the movie.

The chapel also is featured in The Exorcist III, released in 1990.

Image gallery

See also 

 Healy Hall
 List of Georgetown University buildings
 List of Jesuit sites
 Old North Building

References

External links 

 Official site
 Georgetown Campus Ministry

Georgetown University buildings
Religious organizations established in 1893
Roman Catholic churches completed in 1893
Roman Catholic churches in Washington, D.C.
1893 establishments in Washington, D.C.
19th-century Roman Catholic church buildings in the United States
Jesuit churches in the United States
University and college chapels in the United States
Sacred Heart devotions
Gothic Revival church buildings in Washington, D.C.
Brick buildings and structures
Churches in Georgetown (Washington, D.C.)
Chapels in Washington, D.C.